Chopoqlu or Chepeqlu or Chepoqlu or Chopoqolu or Çopoqlu or Chapqolu, also rendered as Choboqlu or Jabukalu, may refer to various places in Iran:
 Chopoqlu, Bonab, East Azerbaijan Province
 Chopoqlu, Charuymaq, East Azerbaijan Province
 Chapqolu, Meyaneh, East Azerbaijan Province
 Chopoqlu, Bahar, Hamadan Province
 Chopoqlu, Famenin, Hamadan Province
 Chopoqlu, Razan, Hamadan Province
 Chopoqlu, Kurdistan
 Chopoqlu, Howmeh, Zanjan Province
 Chopoqlu, Karasf, Zanjan Province